Jonah and the Pink Whale is a 1995 Mexican-Bolivian co-production film directed by Juan Carlos Valdivia. The film is based on the 1987 novel by José Wolfango Montes Vannuci The film focuses on the relationship of Jonas, a photographer and his romantic relationship with his sister-in-law.

Jonah and the Pink Whale was the Bolivian entry for the Best Foreign Language Film competition in the 68th Academy Awards, but it did not receive an Oscar nomination.

See also
 List of submissions to the 68th Academy Awards for Best Foreign Language Film
 List of Bolivian submissions for the Academy Award for Best Foreign Language Film

References

External links

1995 films
Bolivian comedy films
1990s Spanish-language films
1995 comedy films
Mexican comedy films
1990s Mexican films